Radio News Hub is a provider of news bulletins for radio stations based in the United Kingdom. The company, which has its head office in Leeds, West Yorkshire, provides 60 second and 120 second bulletins for English speaking radio stations both in the United Kingdom and internationally. As of 2021 it produces bulletins for more than 300 stations.

History

Launched in 2014, Radio News Hub was established to provide an alternative news service to existing providers, and was founded by a team of four journalists; Dave Uttley, Jamie Fletcher, Jon Francis and Stephanie Otty. As well as providing news updates it also supplies weather, travel, sport and entertainment bulletins. In 2018 the company celebrated providing its one millionth bulletin to its providers. Also in 2018 the company launched a new website and redesigned its dispatch system. In 2020, Radio News Hub appointed former talkRADIO news presenter Carl Hartley as a senior journalist.

Having started its operations in an underground office in 2014, Radio News Hub moved to a serviced office block in the city in 2015. In November 2020, it announced plans to relocate to purpose-built studios, also based in Leeds.

Radio News Hub content is broadcast on digital station News Radio UK.

National and international news, sport, business and showbiz bulletins are broadcast on a rolling ten minute loop. The station is also used to offer for special live programming to client stations, including UK and US election night coverage.

A 10 minute extended "Lunchtime News" and "Evening News" programme is available on weekdays to client stations.

Radio News Hub's national weather bulletins broadcast every hour on Boom Radio.

In January 2023, Radio News Hub was acquired by Markettiers4DC, a broadcasting PR agency. 

On 13 February 2023 it was announced that Radio News Hub had become an official partner of the Radio Academy. The agreement meant Radio News Hub would be the official partners for the 2023 Radio Festival and the 2023 Audio and Radio Industry Awards.

Free news bulletins
In March 2020 Radio News Hub announced that it would produce a daily ten-minute round-up of news relating to the COVID-19 pandemic that would be made available free of charge to any radio station that wishes to carry the bulletin. In September 2022, a free daily bulletin covering events following the death of Queen Elizabeth II was also offered. On 7 March 2023, Radio  News Hub announced it would make a free two-hour live programme available providing budget coverage on Budget Day (15 March). The programme would include coverage of the budget speech, as well as analysis from a panel of experts.

References

External links
 

Mass media companies of England
Companies based in Leeds
2014 establishments in the United Kingdom